Bailey Tzuke (born Bailey Jean Muggleton-Tzuke; 28 June 1987) is an English singer-songwriter. She is the daughter of the singer-songwriter Judie Tzuke and record producer Paul Muggleton.

Tzuke has toured with and performed backing vocals for her mother for many years. In October 2007, she was featured on the Freemasons song "Uninvited" (a reworking of the 1998 Alanis Morissette song) which made number 8 in the UK charts and number 4 in the Netherlands.

More recently, Tzuke has since contributed vocals to Rollo Armstrong's new project "All Thieves". She has also been working on her own material, having signed up to the digital distribution company AWAL (Artists Without A Label). She released her debut EP, Strong, in May 2010, followed by another EP, Laid Bare, in October 2010. A live recording, Alive, was released in 2011 via Judie Tzuke's official website.

Discography 
Albums/EPs
Strong (2010)
Laid Bare (2010)
Alive (live recording) (2011)

Singles

References

External links
 Official Website

1987 births
Living people
English people of Polish descent
English women singer-songwriters
21st-century English women singers
21st-century English singers